Dimelaena oreina, the golden moonglow lichen, is a greenish yellow placodioid lichen. The color of the greenish yellow thallus is derived from usnic acid in the cortex.

Habitat and range
It has a worldwide distribution outside the tropics, Australasia, and Antarctica. It is common in the Sonoran Desert of Arizona, California, Baja California, Baja California Sur, Sonora, Mexico, and Chihuahua, Mexico.

References

Caliciales
Lichen species
Lichens described in 1810
Lichens of Europe
Lichens of North America
Lichens of South America
Taxa named by Erik Acharius